Peter Bang may refer to:

 Peter Fibiger Bang (born 1973), Danish comparative historian
 Peter Georg Bang (1797–1861), Danish politician and jurist
 Peter Bang (engineer) (1900–1957), engineer and co-founder of Bang & Olufsen